Archidendron pahangense is a species of legume in the family Fabaceae. It is a tree endemic to Peninsular Malaysia. It is threatened by habitat loss.

References

pahangense
Endemic flora of Peninsular Malaysia
Trees of Peninsular Malaysia
Conservation dependent plants
Taxonomy articles created by Polbot